The military history of Finland consists of hundreds of years of armed actions in the territory encompassing modern Finland.

Prehistory
Finland was first settled around 8300 BC, immediately after the last ice age.  Archaeological evidence of prehistoric warfare is largely incomplete, primarily because prehistoric skeletons, which might bear traces of violent traumas, rarely survive in the Finnish soil. From the Bronze Age (1500–500 BC) onwards, improved weapons, such as battle-axes and swords, are included in the archaeological record. There is also evidence of hill-forts from the same time period.  Weapons are common finds from the Roman Iron Age (1 A.D. – 400 A.D.) onwards.

Middle Ages

Viking attacks on Finland are indicated only by a couple of runic inscriptions in Sweden, as well as some uncertain saga sources. According to one saga, Olaf the Holy, later a King of Norway, made an attack on a country that has often been interpreted as south-western Finland; he was defeated.

Before the 14th century Finnish history is very poorly documented. However, archaeological evidence, for example hill-forts, suggests that the 12th and 13th centuries were relatively restless, as Sweden and the Russian state of Novgorod were slowly spreading their dominance in Northeastern Europe. The Swedish kingdom championed Roman Catholic Christianity, whereas Novgorod was an Eastern Orthodox state. Several raids and attacks against the Finns are mentioned in Russian chronicles during the 12th and 13th centuries. Both Swedes and Danes made offensives against the Finns. These operations were dubbed as "Crusades" in later historiography.

According to the Icelandic Egil's Saga, the Norse and the (Northern) Fennic people united their forces, apparently during the 12th century, against attacks by the Karelians who—with the assistance of Novgorod (part of today's Russia)—made advances towards Northern Finland and Norway.

According to some sources, the Karelians destroyed the Swedish town of Sigtuna in 1187.

In 1251 the Finnish Karelians again fought against the Norwegians, and in 1271 the two Finnish peoples, the Kvens and the Karelians, cooperated in wars and battles against the Norwegians in Hålogaland (Haalogaland).

Finland as a part of Sweden

During the several following centuries, a gradual and slow process of Swedish expansion in today's Finland and the consolidation of Sweden took place, not through wars fought between the Finns and the Swedes, but rather by various levels of wars and skirmishes between the Finns themselves, others—in the west, such as the people of Häme—sympathising with the Catholic Swedes, and others—in the eastern parts, particularly the Karelians—cooperating with the Orthodox Russians.

Furthermore, during the first several centuries of the Swedish expansion to the traditional lands of the Finns—up to the 16th century and beyond—only the south-western parts of the area known today as Finland (then the lands of the Finns reached also beyond today's borders of the Republic of Finland) had been reached by the Swedish expansion and thus had become part of the Swedish realm.

From 1323 until 1809, Finland was officially an integral part of the Swedish Realm, including first only the south-western lands inhabited by the Finns but expanding east as time went by.

Finnish soldiers fought in at least 38 known wars of Sweden, all of them having something to do with either power struggles within the Swedish royal family or struggles between Sweden and other nations.

Grand Duchy of Finland

As a result of the so-called Finnish War of 1808–1809 Finland became an autonomous Grand Duchy of Finland in the Russian Empire until Finland's declaration of independence on December 6, 1917.  During that period the Finnish army participated in the wars of Russia, such as the Crimean War—during which, in 1855, the French and the British navies attacked Finland—and the First World War.

Republic of Finland

From 1917 on Finland has been an independent republic.  This period started with the Finnish Civil War in 1918, between the Reds (communists) and the Whites (mixed right wing, liberal and centrist groups allied against the Reds), soon after Finland's declaration of independence. The former were supported by Bolshevik Russia, and the latter by the German Empire. The Whites eventually defeated the Reds.

World War II

In 1939, Finland was in war against the Soviet Union during the Winter War. The war lasted 105 days.

The Continuation War against the Soviet Union lasted from the summer of 1941 until the fall of 1944.

In 1944 and 1945, Finland attacked German Wehrmacht forces leaving the country in the Lapland War.

Post World War II 
Soon after the birth of the United Nations, Finnish military troops—including various types of military personnel and advisers—started participating in many UN peacekeeping operations, beginning in 1956 with the United Nations Emergency Force at the Suez Crisis. Defense strategy in Finland after World War II required tact and diplomacy. In the event of major hostilities, The Finnish Defence Forces basically needed to hold off attackers and establish an evacuation corridor, most likely to the West, just long enough for the population center in the areas surrounding the capital to evacuate to safety. Because it was not clear from which direction troops might come during the Cold War, it was necessary to train for all possibilities without antagonizing NATO, the Soviet Union, or neighboring countries. 

In response to the 2022 Russian invasion of Ukraine, Finland announced that it would apply to join the NATO military alliance, ending its postwar policy of neutrality.

See also
 List of Finnish wars
 Finnish–Estonian defense cooperation

References 

 

fi:Suomen sodat